Ryan Peterson (born 19 June 1996) is an Australian professional footballer who plays college soccer for the University of Virginia.

He had previously played for the Central Coastal Mariners Academy and the Central Coast Mariners FC.

References

External links

1996 births
Living people
Association football forwards
Australian soccer players
Central Coast Mariners FC players
Virginia Cavaliers men's soccer players
A-League Men players
Australian expatriate soccer players
Expatriate soccer players in the United States
Australian expatriate sportspeople in the United States
Central Coast Mariners Academy players
Marconi Stallions FC players
Macquarie University alumni
Soccer players from Sydney